Les Pots cassés is a 1993 Canadian drama film directed by François Bouvier. It was entered into the 18th Moscow International Film Festival where Gilles Desjardins won a Diploma for the Script.

Cast
 Gilbert Sicotte as Robert
 Marie Tifo as Marianne
 Marc Messier as Gérald
 Louise Deslières as Céline
 Jean-Marc Parent as Roch
 Raymond Cloutier as Bertrand
 Suzanne Garceau as Libraire
 James Hyndman as Charles
 Bernadette Li as Lylyl
 Hank Hum as Patron du restaurant chinois

References

External links
 

1993 films
1993 drama films
Canadian drama films
Films directed by François Bouvier
French-language Canadian films
1990s Canadian films